Tengliu (滕六) is the goddess of snow in Chinese mythology. Tengliu first appeared in the Tang Dynasty and later became a popular cultural figure in the Ming Dynasty through the development in the Song Dynasty.

Origin 
Since the Song Dynasty, the snow goddess Tengliu appeared widely in songs and fu. As a result, the goddess had major influence in the belief system and language expression system of Chinese culture.

In the book Mengzi Waishu (孟子外书), the writings explain that  was allowed to have a relationship with Tengliu, something widely circulated in the Song Dynasty. The story of the Song Dynasty became more deeply rooted in the hearts of the people.

References

 Chinese deities
 Chinese goddesses